Rone Tempest is a Salt Lake City, UT-based American author and investigative reporter. He won a 1997 Goldsmith Prize for Investigative Reporting. Working for the Los Angeles Times, he shared the 2004 Pulitzer Prize for Breaking News Reporting, for its coverage of the Old Fire, a wildfire in October 2003.  He is a frequent contributor to  the nonprofit Wyoming news site wyofile.com that he cofounded with Christopher Findlater in 2008. In 2018 he joined the board of the non-profit Utah Investigative Journalism Project for which he contributes occasional articles to the Salt Lake Tribune. He is the author of the nonfiction book "The Last Western"  NeoText (2020) and  ebook "Two Elk Saga: How Man's Dream Became State, Federal Nightmare" published by Atavist press (2014)

Life
He graduated from the University of California, Berkeley. He worked for the Oklahoma City Times, Daily Oklahoman, Oklahoma Journal, Detroit Free Press, and Dallas Times Herald. He was a reporter for the Los Angeles Times, from 1976 to 2007 where he served as bureau chief in Houston, New Delhi, Paris, Beijing, Hong Kong  and Sacramento.

Tempest was visiting lecturer at the University of California, Berkeley, from 1999 to 2007  and from 2007 to 2010 consultant to  ProPublica.

He lives in Salt Lake City, Utah.

References

External links
https://www.ronetempest.com/
Wyofile.com
Mediabistro.com

American male journalists
Los Angeles Times people
Pulitzer Prize for Breaking News Reporting winners
Living people
University of California, Berkeley alumni
University of California, Berkeley faculty
Year of birth missing (living people)
Place of birth missing (living people)
People from Lander, Wyoming
People from Bellevue, Nebraska
People from Sarpy County, Nebraska